The 1996–97 Slovenian Football Cup was the sixth season of the Slovenian Football Cup, Slovenia's football knockout competition.

Qualified clubs

1995–96 Slovenian PrvaLiga members
Beltinci
Celje
Gorica
Izola
Korotan Prevalje
Maribor
Mura
Olimpija
Primorje
Rudar Velenje

Qualified through MNZ Regional Cups
MNZ Ljubljana: Ljubljana, Vevče, Mengeš
MNZ Maribor: Železničar Maribor, Akumulator, Kovinar Maribor
MNZ Celje: Šentjur, Šmartno
MNZ Koper: Jadran, Ankaran
MNZ Nova Gorica: Renče, Komen
MNZ Murska Sobota: Veržej, Bakovci, Goričanka
MNZ Lendava: Nafta Lendava, Odranci
MNZG-Kranj: Triglav Kranj, Naklo
MNZ Ptuj: Drava Ptuj, Aluminij, Središče

First round

|}

Round of 16

|}

Quarter-finals

|}

Semi-finals

|}

Final

First leg

Second leg

Slovenian Football Cup seasons
Cup
Slovenian Cup